Henry Moram Matthew (16 April 1870 – 19 February 1956) was a Scottish footballer who played as a wing half in the English Football League for Bolton Wanderers and Preston North End. He also played in the Scottish League for Dundee, in the Southern League for Millwall Athletic and Watford, in the Irish League for Distillery, and in English non-league football for Darlington and Gravesend United. He played representative football for both the Southern League and Irish League teams.

References

1870 births
1956 deaths
Footballers from Dundee
Scottish footballers
Association football wing halves
Darlington F.C. players
Bolton Wanderers F.C. players
Dundee F.C. players
Millwall F.C. players
Preston North End F.C. players
Gravesend United F.C. players
Lisburn Distillery F.C. players
Watford F.C. players
Northern Football League players
English Football League players
Scottish Football League players
Southern Football League players
NIFL Premiership players
Southern Football League representative players
Irish League representative players